Synchiropus novaecaledoniae, the West Jumeau bigeye dragonet, is a species of fish in the family Callionymidae, the dragonets. It is found in the Western Central Pacific.

Etymology
The fish is named after New Caledonia where the fish is found.

References

novaecaledoniae
Fish of the Pacific Ocean
Taxa named by Ronald Fricke
Fish described in 1981